The 2005 United Nations Climate Change Conference took place between November 28 and December 9, 2005, in Montreal, Quebec, Canada. The conference included the 11th Conference of the Parties (COP11) to the United Nations Framework Convention on Climate Change (UNFCCC), and was the first Meeting of the Parties (MOP1) to the Kyoto Protocol since their initial meeting in Kyoto in 1997. 

The conference was one of the largest intergovernmental conferences on climate change ever. The event marked the entry into force of the Kyoto Protocol on 16 February 2005. Hosting more than 10,000 delegates, it was one of Canada's largest international events ever and the largest gathering in Montreal since Expo 67. 

The Montreal Action Plan was an agreement to "extend the life of the Kyoto Protocol beyond its 2012 expiration date and negotiate deeper cuts in greenhouse gas emissions" by starting negotiations, without delay on an extension of the protocol. Canada's environment minister, at the time, Stéphane Dion, said the agreement provides a "map for the future".

References

21st-century diplomatic conferences (UN)
Diplomatic conferences in Canada
2005
2005
2005 in international relations
2005 in the environment
2000s in Montreal
2005 in Quebec
November 2005 events in Canada
December 2005 events in Canada
Events in Montreal